Rannaniidi Cliffs Landscape Conservation Area is a nature park which is located in Saare County, Estonia.

The area of the nature park is 98 ha.

The protected area was founded in 1959 to protect Rannaniidi Cliffs. In 2005, the protected area was designated to the landscape conservation area.

References

Nature reserves in Estonia
Geography of Saare County